Kai T. Salomaa is a Finnish Canadian theoretical computer scientist, known for his numerous contributions to the state complexity of finite automata.
His highly cited 1994 joint paper with Yu and Zhuang
laid the foundations of the area.
He has published over 100 papers in scientific journals on various subjects in formal language theory. Salomaa is a full professor at Queen's University (Kingston, Ontario).

Biography
Salomaa did his undergraduate studies at the University of Turku, where he has earned his Ph.D. degree in 1989; his dissertation was jointly supervised by Ronald V. Book and Magnus Steinby. In the 1990s, Salomaa worked at the University of Western Ontario. Since 1999, he holds a professor position at Queen's University. His father, Arto Salomaa, is also a distinguished computer scientist with numerous contributions to the fields of automata theory and formal languages.

References

External links
 
 
 

Canadian computer scientists
Finnish computer scientists
Academic staff of Queen's University at Kingston
University of Turku alumni
People from Turku
Living people
Finnish expatriates in Canada
Year of birth missing (living people)